Duke of Edinburgh Assassinated or The Vindication of Henry Parkes is a 1971 Australian play written by Bob Ellis and Dick Hall. It followed Ellis' successful The Legend of King O'Malley.

Background
In 1970 Bob Ellis went to a party given by Gough Whitlam's secretary Dick Hall thinking he was going to be asked to write speeches for Whitlam. Instead Hall proposed they collaborate on a musical about the attempted assassination of Prince Alfred in Sydney in 1868. They wrote the play over weekends.

Productions
It premiered at the Nimrod Theatre in 1971 directed by Aarne Neame. Reviewing the 1971 production the Sydney Morning Herald critic felt the second half was better than the first. The reviewer from The Bulletin said:
Slabs   of   factual research   and   transcription   covering trials,   commissions   and   interviews   (fascinating   in   content,   no   doubt,   but  deadly   dull   as   theatre)   are   interspersed with   stretches   of   music-hall   song-and  dance   routines   in   a   desperately   contrived   effort   to   sugar   the   pill. But   the   pill   sticks   firmly   in   the   throat. The   authors   are   concerned   with   politics, not   Parkes.   They   have   produced   a   play without   characters,   a   documentary dolled   up   as   a   theatrical   event   and   a somewhat   confusing   documentary   at  that.
The play was also produced in Melbourne in 1972.

References

1971 plays
Australian plays
Australian musicals